The 1994 Mid-Continent Conference men's basketball tournament was held March 6–8, 1994 in Rosemont, Illinois.
This was the eleventh edition of the tournament for the Association of Mid-Continent Universities, now known as the Summit League. The winner of this tournament would go on receive a berth to the 1994 NCAA Division I men's basketball tournament, often referred to as NCAA March Madness, later that month.

Bracket

References

1993–94 Mid-Continent Conference men's basketball season
Summit League men's basketball tournament
1994 in sports in Ohio